GaiaEHR is free and open-source medical practice management and electronic health record software.

Technologies
The software suite is written as a web application and includes both server and client. The server is written in PHP and can be employed in conjunction with a LAMP "stack", though other operating systems are supported as well. The client side does not employ a common web browser, but some own software based on the Ext JS JavaScript application framework.

GaiaEHR is free and open-source software subject to the terms of the GNU General Public License (GPL).

History
The GaiaEHR project originally forked from OpenEMR in September 2009 as MitosEHR but after a few years the project and repository were renamed to GaiaEHR. Active development seems to have stopped in 2016.

Screenshots

References 

Free health care software
Electronic health record software
Healthcare software for Linux
Healthcare software for macOS
Healthcare software for Windows